Oriol Ayala Serra (born 19 October 1996) is a Spanish footballer who plays as a centre-back for Olot.

Club career
Born in Girona, Catalonia, Ayala joined Real Madrid's La Fábrica in 2014, after stints at Girona FC, UE Fornells and CEF Gironès-Sàbat. On 7 July of the following year, after finishing his formation, he moved to Palamós CF in Tercera División.

Ayala made his senior debut during the 2015–16 campaign, being a regular starter. On 13 June 2017, he joined Segunda División B side UE Llagostera, but only featured rarely for the club.

In January 2018, Ayala signed for CF Reus Deportiu and was assigned to the reserves in the fourth division. He made his professional debut on 18 October, starting in a 1–3 away loss against UD Almería, for the season's Copa del Rey.

In July 2019, after Reus' severe economic problems, Ayala joined fellow fourth division side UE Figueres.

Ayala moved to Olot on 13 July 2021.

References

External links
Real Madrid profile

1996 births
Living people
Sportspeople from Girona
Spanish footballers
Footballers from Catalonia
Association football defenders
Segunda División B players
Tercera División players
Palamós CF footballers
UE Costa Brava players
CF Reus Deportiu B players
CF Reus Deportiu players
UE Figueres footballers